Cephonodes banksi is a moth of the family Sphingidae.

Distribution 
It is known from the Philippines and Sulawesi.

Description 
The upperside of the abdomen is tri-coloured (the anterior is dark green, the median reddish-orange with a cream band and the posterior is brownish-orange/black). The abdomen upperside has a prominent transverse white line preceding a reddish-orange band. The rear part of the abdomen (posterior to the reddish-orange band) is brownish-orange. The head, anterior part of the thorax, forelegs and midlegs are bright orange. Females are larger and darker than males.

Subspecies
Cephonodes banksi banksi (Philippines)
Cephonodes banksi johani Cadiou, 1999 (Sulawesi)

References

Cephonodes
Moths described in 1923